One Hand Clapping may refer to:

 One hand clapping (phrase), a phrase derived from a Buddhist kōan known as "The sound of one hand"
 One Hand Clapping (film), a television special featuring Paul McCartney and Wings
 One Hand Clapping (novel), a novel by Anthony Burgess 
 One Hand Clapping - The Unreleased Demos 2001-2003, an album by Shed Seven
 One-Hand Clapping, a 2001 Danish comedy film written and directed by Gert Fredholm

See also
 The Sound of One Hand Clapping (disambiguation)